Luke Thompson (born 27 April 1995) is an English professional rugby league footballer who plays as  and  for the Canterbury-Bankstown Bulldogs, and for England and Great Britain at international level.

He has played his most of his professional career to date for St Helens, with whom he won the 2014 Super League Grand Final. He has also spent time on loan from Saints at the Rochdale Hornets in the Championship 1.

Background
Thompson was born in Wigan, Greater Manchester, England.

Career 
Thompson has been at his hometown club of St Helens since he was 11 (signing from Bold Miners).

2013 
Thompson made his Super League debut during the 2013 season in the Saints' 21-14 round 9 loss againts the London Broncos. On 27th September, Thompson's contract was extended by 2 years. Thompson played 7 games for St Helens and scored 3 tries.

2014 
In Round 21 of the 2014 Super League season, Thompson scored a try in the Saints' 58-16 win over the London Broncos. St Helens reached the 2014 Super League Grand Final and Thompson was selected to play from the interchange bench in their 14-6 victory over the Wigan Warriors at Old Trafford. Thompson played 17 games for St Helens and scored a try.

2015 
Thompson played 20 games for St Helens during the 2015 Super League season, including their Super 8s campaign.

2016 
Thompson continued playing with St Helens during the 2016 Super League season, including their 10-18 semi-final loss to Warrington Wolves. He finished the year playing 23 games and scoring 2 tries.

2017 
Thompson played in St Helens' 22-23 semi-final loss to Castleford Tigers. He finished the year with 27 games and 2 tries.

2018 
In 2018, Thompson had one of his best years yet, playing 32 games and scoring 6 tries. He played in St Helens' 13-18 loss to Warrington.

2019 
He played in the 2019 Challenge Cup Final defeat to the Warrington Wolves at Wembley Stadium.
He played in the 2019 Super League Grand Final victory over the Salford Red Devils at Old Trafford.

2020 
On 4th February, it was announced Thompson had signed a three-year deal with Canterbury-Bankstown Bulldogs in the NRL. Thompson made the move to Australia in June. He completed two weeks of isolation on his arrival in Australia before his first game for the Canterbury-Bankstown club.

Thompson made his debut for the Bulldogs against the Brisbane Broncos in round 9 of the 2020 NRL season.
In round 20 of the 2020 NRL season, Thompson was placed on report for reportedly eye gouging one of the Penrith players during Canterbury's 42-0 loss.  Thompson was later suspended for four matches after being found guilty.
Thompson made 10 appearances for Canterbury in the 2020 NRL season as the club narrowly avoided the wooden spoon finishing 15th on the table.

2021 
In round 5 of the 2021 NRL season, Thompson scored his first try for Canterbury in a 52-18 loss against Melbourne.  It was also Canterbury's first try in over 240 minutes of play as they had been held scoreless from the previous three games.
In round 19 of the 2021 NRL season, Thompson scored a try but was later sent to the sin bin during Canterbury's 44-24 loss against Cronulla-Sutherland.  On 27 July 2021, Thompson was handed a three-match ban over the sin binning incident.
Thompson made a total of 15 appearances for Canterbury in the 2021 NRL season as the club finished last and claimed the Wooden Spoon.

2022 
Thompson played a total of 13 matches for Canterbury in the 2022 NRL season as the club finished 12th on the table.

2023 
On the 28 February, Thompson injured his ankle at training, and was assisted off the field. Canterbury general manager Phil Gould later revealed that the injury was quite serious, and initial prognosis was minimum 6 months recovery.

International career
In 2018 he was selected for England against France at the Leigh Sports Village.

He was selected in squad for the 2019 Great Britain Lions tour of the Southern Hemisphere. He made his Great Britain test debut in the defeat to Tonga.

References

External links
St Helens profile
SL profile
Saints Heritage Society profile
England profile

1995 births
Living people
Canterbury-Bankstown Bulldogs players
England national rugby league team players
English rugby league players
Great Britain national rugby league team players
Rugby league locks
Rugby league players from St Helens, Merseyside
Rugby league props
St Helens R.F.C. players